José María Leyva (2 April 1877 – 1956) was a militant guerrilla in the  (PLM, Mexican Liberal Party), who was a general in the  in Baja California.

Biography
Leyva was born in Tetaroba El Fuerte, Sinaloa, on 2 April 1877. He joined the Mexican Liberal Party in 1904. On 29 January 1911, Leyva, Simón Berthold and a group of 30 guerrillas took the town of Mexicali, an event that marked the beginning of the liberation campaign of PLM in Baja California.

After the  invaded Ciudad Juarez, Leyva decided to join the party, naming Francisco I. Madero commander of forces in Baja California and then political head of Cuajimalpa in the Federal District. He was part of the committee that met in Los Angeles in June 1911 with the organizing meeting of the Mexican Liberal Party so that it desist from armed struggle and recognize the triumph of Madero and Francisco León de la Barra as provisional president, according to the Treaty of Ciudad Juárez.

After the Ten Tragic Days, he joined the constitutional movement in 1913 where he was part of the Convention of Aguascalientes. He remained in political life until 1920, when he supported the Plan of Agua Prieta. He retired as a brigadier general in 1914 and died in Mexico City in 1956.

See also
 Magonism
 Magonista rebellion of 1911
 Mexican Revolution

References

1877 births
Military personnel from Sinaloa
People of the Mexican Revolution
Magonists
1956 deaths